Kenzieville is a community in the Canadian province of Nova Scotia, located  in Pictou County.

References

Communities in Pictou County